Muy buenos días (English: Very Good Morning) was a Chilean morning show that was broadcast on TVN from August 22, 2016 to October 21, 2019,  replacing Buenos Días a Todos. It was broadcast every Monday to Friday at 08:00 (CLT). Was replaced by Buenos Días a Todos.

Hosts 
 Cristián Sánchez 
 María Luisa Godoy

Panelists 

 Begoña Basauri 
 Iván Torres
 Macarena Tondreu 
 Andrea Arístegui
 Luis Sandoval

Journalists 

 Bernardita Middleton
 Gino Costa

See also 
 Televisión Nacional de Chile

External links 
  

2016 Chilean television series debuts
2010s Chilean television series
Televisión Nacional de Chile original programming
Breakfast television